Kerikeri is the largest town in Northland, New Zealand. It is sometimes called the Cradle of the Nation, as it was the site of the first permanent mission station in the country, and it has some of the most historic buildings in the country.

A rapidly expanding centre of subtropical and allied horticulture, Kerikeri is in the Far North District of the North Island and lies at the western extremity of the Kerikeri Inlet, a northwestern arm of the Bay of Islands, where fresh water of the Kerikeri River enters the Pacific Ocean.

The village was established by New Zealand's pioneering missionaries, who called it Gloucester Town, but the name did not endure. The Māori word Kerikeri was interpreted by said missionaries as Keddi Keddi or Kiddeekiddee, before the romanisation methods they used were revised to what is used today.

In 1814, Samuel Marsden acquired land at Kerikeri from Hongi Hika for the use of the Church Missionary Society for a payment of forty-eight axes. The protector of the Kerikeri mission station was the chief, Ruatara, a nephew of Hongi Hika.

Kerikeri was the first place in New Zealand where grape vines were planted. Samuel Marsden planted 100 vines on 25 September 1819 and noted in his journal that New Zealand promised to be very favourable to the vine. In the same year Charlotte Kemp planted the first citrus. New Zealand's first commercial plantings of passionfruit were established in 1927, and in around 1932 the country's first avocados were planted. The plough was first used in New Zealand at Kerikeri, by Rev. J. G. Butler, on 3 May 1820.

Origins and naming 
The origin of the name Kerikeri is not exactly known, and there have been many conflicting definitions given over the years. It is likely Kerikeri derives its name from the river as John Nicholas wrote "the river that discharged itself into the cove was called by the natives Tecaddiecaddie....". after visiting the area in 1815.

The definition of the word Kerikeri most widely known by pākehā (New Zealanders of European descent) is 'dig dig', or 'to keep digging'. It is known that Māori had extensive gardens in the area when Europeans arrived.

Another definition derives from Kerikeri te ana wai — "the churning or boiling over of the waters". That would have aptly described the freshwater river tumbling into the salt water over the falls which were then higher (being blasted early in the 1900s to accommodate a bridge). However, some Māori say it derives from hukerikeri which means "bubbling up", and there is a sad reasoning behind this. Hongi Hika, a famous or infamous chief depending on whether one fought with or against him, is reputed to have fathered the child of a captured slave at Kororipo Pā. As this was unacceptable to the tribe, the baby was placed in the water to drown but persistently rose to the surface, hence the "bubbling up".

What are now called Wharepuke Falls, upriver from the Stone Store Basin, were called the Kerikeri Falls until the 1930s when given the name Wharepoke which referred to the large adjacent area of native bush. A French doctor, Messier Lesson, visited Kerikeri in 1824 and wrote that among stomach ailments suffered by Māori was "gravelle" (gravel) which they called Kiddee Kiddee. He said it was also the word for a cascade of water.

There are also persistent claims that the falls referred to by the missionaries as "The Kiddikiddi" were what we now call the Rainbow Falls. That is impossible because although Nicholas visited and referred to Tecaddiecaddie in 1815 it was not until 1822 that missionaries Francis Hall and James Kemp became the first Europeans to see them.

Tourist slogan
The local Kerikeri slogan is "It's So Nice They Named It Twice". In the early 1980s, an anonymous backpacker wrote those words in the Visitors' Book at the Kerikeri Youth Hostel. It was brought to the attention of the then editor of the local newspaper, the Kerikeri Chronicle, who gave it publicity, and it quickly became adopted as a quasi-official slogan. Kerikeri is a former winner of the "New Zealand's Top Small Town" title bestowed annually by North and South magazine, and this has since been the main focus of most tourism marketing of the town.

Demographics

Kerikeri had a population of 7,164 at the 2018 New Zealand census, an increase of 1,149 people (19.1%) since the 2013 census, and an increase of 1,674 people (30.5%) since the 2006 census. There were 2,844 households, comprising 3,399 males and 3,762 females, giving a sex ratio of 0.9 males per female, with 1,245 people (17.4%) aged under 15 years, 969 (13.5%) aged 15 to 29, 2,871 (40.1%) aged 30 to 64, and 2,076 (29.0%) aged 65 or older.

Ethnicities were 86.4% European/Pākehā, 17.4% Māori, 3.2% Pacific peoples, 4.9% Asian, and 1.7% other ethnicities. People may identify with more than one ethnicity.

The percentage of people born overseas was 28.4, compared with 27.1% nationally.

Although some people chose not to answer the census's question about religious affiliation, 52.5% had no religion, 35.6% were Christian, 1.3% had Māori religious beliefs, 1.0% were Hindu, 0.3% were Muslim, 0.7% were Buddhist and 1.8% had other religions.

Of those at least 15 years old, 1,185 (20.0%) people had a bachelor's or higher degree, and 948 (16.0%) people had no formal qualifications. 759 people (12.8%) earned over $70,000 compared to 17.2% nationally. The employment status of those at least 15 was that 2,337 (39.5%) people were employed full-time, 885 (15.0%) were part-time, and 219 (3.7%) were unemployed.

Historic sites

Kororipo pā 
Kororipo pā is the remains of a Māori fortified settlement in the Kerikeri basin. Historically it is known Ngāi Tawake defended the pā as their outlet to the sea in the 1770s and it was the launch place Hongi Hika used in the 1820s for raids on other tribes.

Mission House 

Originally called the Mission House, and then for more than 100 years Kemp House, but now again called Mission House, this is the oldest wooden structure still standing in New Zealand. A much visited and photographed building, it is administered along with the Stone Store (see below) by Heritage New Zealand.

It was built by the Church Missionary Society for the Rev John Butler (New Zealand's first clergyman) who became the first occupant in 1822, but only for a short while. There was a succession of occupants until 1832 when the mission blacksmith James Kemp and his wife Charlotte Kemp moved in with their family. The Kemps acquired ownership of the house and surrounding land in 1859 by trading land they owned at nearby Kororipo Point.

From then on the Mission House became Kemp House and it remained in the Kemp family until 1974 when it was given to the Nation by Ernest Kemp, a great grandson of the missionary James Kemp and Charlotte Kemp.

St. James Church
St James''', the wooden church on the hill above the Stone Store, is the third built in the area, and second on this picturesque site overlooking the basin. The missionaries' first little combined chapel and school was built near the water and dedicated on 19 April 1824. It was replaced in 1829 when a  lath and plaster structure was erected on the present site of St James. It came complete with a town clock which was later incorporated in the Stone Store.

The new and slightly larger St James, built of weatherboard and battens, was dedicated in 1878. It was another 85 years before the church was extended to its present-day size to cater for a growing congregation (1963). In 1968 a damaging tornado hit Kerikeri with enough force to skew St James' off line. Services had to be held elsewhere until a major repair and restoration was completed. The church bell came from HMNZS Black Prince, a light cruiser which had served with the Royal New Zealand Navy.

Stone Store

The Stone Store, a former storehouse, is the oldest stone building in New Zealand, construction having begun on 19 April 1832. The keystone above the door bearing the date 1833 is thought to have been carved by the stonemason William Parrott who cut the Sydney sandstone in situ, but construction of the building was not actually completed until mid-1836.

Stone was used because the missionaries needed a vermin-free, fireproof area for their supplies and provisions, and for improved security from inquisitive Māori. There was a plan to build a mill where the bridge exists now, and to protect the flour produced from locally grown wheat in the store. But the mill was never built, and the millstones brought out from England went inland to Waimate North instead.

Curiously enough, when work started on the building, Māori were already moving out of the district, and when it was finally completed there were very few Māori remaining at Kerikeri. Furthermore, there were rumblings within the missionary community that Kerikeri was becoming the backwater of missionary activity, eliminating the need to store goods and provisions there. It was considered a folly at the time, but one that blesses Kerikeri today.

Over the years, the Stone Store suffered the cumulative effects of adjacent traffic movements and the ravages of normal wear and tear. Costly remedial work was required and in the 21st century a bypass was constructed and opened on 23 June 2008, to divert traffic and protect the building for posterity. The old stone store bridge was completely removed in the second half of 2008. The reasons for removal of the original bridge are controversial, and there was a groundswell of protest from a number of local residents. The bridge was removed regardless and the debate over whether this was the correct course of action has yet to be resolved in the minds of many residents. The building has been restored to its original state, but does not include the tower on the roof containing the clock removed from the chapel further up the hill, which was removed as a safety measure a long time ago.

It was named after Ngāpuhi chief Rewa (also known as Maanu), who was one of three chiefly brothers originally belonging to the Ngai Tawake hapu; the other two brothers being; Te Wharerahi and Moka 'Kainga-mataa' who used to live here in the 1820s-1830s.

Kāinga were sited close to fresh water and local fishing waters or gardens, and sometimes near fortified pā such as Kororipo which was just over the water.

Te Ahurea has all the features of a true kāinga, including a marae area, chief's whare (house), kauta (cooking shelter), whata (bench where food was placed), tall whata, weapons store, pataka (raised food store), enclosure for the tohunga (a wise person who advised the community on just about everything), rahui (a post marking tapu or out of bounds limits), whare made of bark, waka tiwai (fishing canoe), bird snare, hangi pit (ground oven), genuine historic canoes, family enclosure, rua (storage area ) for kumara (sweet potato) and a paepae haumati (the basic toilet system which was flushed twice daily by the tide).

Mātoa

According to Tūhoronuku Independent Mandated Authority and Te Puni Kōkiri, there is a site north of Kerikeri, called Mātoa, which is a traditional meeting ground of the Ngāpuhi hapū of Ngāti Rēhia and Ngāti Whakaeke.

Arts and culture 
Kerikeri has lots of practicing artists and several art galleries with an annual arts trail held over Labour Weekend called KOAST (Kerikeri Open Art Studios Trail) since 2014. In 2019 the trail featured 40 artists at 21 studios. There is a performing arts and events venue called The Turner Centre that opened in 2005. The Turner Centre presents nationally touring events as well as locally produced performances.

Education 
Kerikeri High School is the largest school in Northland. A secondary (years 7-13) school, with a roll of 

All these schools are coeducational.

NorthTec polytechnic also has a campus in Kerikeri.

Airport
It is served by Air New Zealand flights from Auckland and has a steadily increasing patronage, handling a record 110,000 passengers in financial 2017/2018. The existing terminal was not fit for purpose and did not meet Air New Zealand's requirements, while growth in passenger numbers also put pressure on the existing facilities. A new $4.75 million terminal opened on 16 June 2019 with improved arrivals/departures, baggage screening and luggage collection facilities.

References

External links 

 Welcome To Kerikeri
 Kerikeri map

Far North District
Populated places in the Northland Region
Bay of Islands